This is a list of the Monitor Latino number-one songs of 2008. Chart rankings are based on airplay across radio states in Mexico using the Radio Tracking Data, LLC in real time. Charts are ranked from Monday to Sunday. Besides the General chart, Monitor Latino published "Pop", "Regional Mexican" and "Anglo" charts.

Chart history

General

In 2008, nine songs reached number one on the General chart; all of these songs were entirely in Spanish. Eight acts achieved their first General number-one song in Mexico: Belanova, Juanes, Julieta Venegas, Ha*Ash, Reik, Luis Fonsi, La Oreja de Van Gogh and Banda El Recodo.

"El presente" by Julieta Venegas was the longest-running General number-one of the year, staying at the top position for eleven consecutive weeks, and "Cada Que..." by Belanova was best-performing song of the year.

Pop

Regional

English

See also
List of Top 20 songs for 2008 in Mexico
List of number-one albums of 2008 (Mexico)

References

2008
Number-one songs
Mexico